Cristián Enrique Viel Temperley (born 4 November 1967 in Buenos Aires) is a former Argentine rugby union player. He played as a flanker.

Viel played for Club Newman in the Nacional de Clubes of Argentina.

He had 26 caps for Argentina, from 1993 to 1997, scoring 3 tries, 15 points on aggregate. He was called for the 1995 Rugby World Cup, playing in three games but without scoring.

References

External links

1967 births
Living people
Argentine rugby union players
Argentina international rugby union players
Club Newman rugby union players
Rugby union flankers
Argentina international rugby sevens players
Rugby union players from Buenos Aires